Ivy Ridge station is a SEPTA Regional Rail station in Philadelphia, Pennsylvania. Located at Umbria Street and Parker Avenue in Northwest Philadelphia, it serves the Manayunk/Norristown Line. The initial station was built in a minimalist design similar to that of Elm Street, Norristown. The current station has a 204-space parking lot. In FY 2013, Ivy Ridge station had a weekday average of 602 boardings and 582 alightings.

History

SEPTA constructed Ivy Ridge in 1980 when service was extended an additional  past Manayunk West station, the passenger terminus of the Pennsylvania Railroad's (PRR) Schuylkill Branch since 1960. The single-platform Ivy Ridge station was constructed within the space occupied by the abandoned second track, removed in the early 1960s after the PRR discontinued passenger service to Norristown. A moderate-sized park-and-ride lot was included.

SEPTA suspended service beyond Cynwyd in March 1986 because of deteriorating track conditions and concerns about the Manayunk Bridge; a shuttle bus ran from Manayunk on the Manayunk/Norristown Line.  In August SEPTA constructed the current platforms along the ex-Reading Norristown line down the bluff from the ex-Pennsylvania line. For a while, the park-and-ride lot sat unused until SEPTA erected a 39-step stairway connecting the derelict PRR upper level and RDG lower level station sites. In the beginning, the steep staircase discouraged ridership, but this changed as ridership grew in the 1990s.

While the PRR platform was built to high level standards (a rarity on the SEPTA Regional Rail system), and was constructed before the Americans with Disabilities Act of 1990, the hastily constructed RDG station platform are low level, and currently remain so. (There is no legal step-free station access for passengers, as Parker Avenue, which crosses the current SEPTA tracks, is completely torn up due to construction of condominiums on a brownfield behind the station; a PECO power pylon also blocks any extension of the outbound platform to that street.) SEPTA received criticism for what was seen as a "waste of taxpayer dollars" by building an extensive high-level platform that only saw six years of active service while sitting derelict and attracting vandalism for over 25. The derelict platform was eventually demolished in April 2012.

As it became clear that SEPTA had no interest in reviving service to the upper Ivy Ridge station, the parking lot was expanded with sections of the PRR track being removed. All remaining Schuylkill Branch trackage in Manayunk was dismantled in June 2010 to make way for the Ivy Ridge Trail, a Philadelphia extension of the Cynwyd Heritage Trail over the Pencoyd Viaduct.

Station layout

References

External links

 SEPTA – Ivy Ridge Station

SEPTA Regional Rail stations
Railway stations in Philadelphia
Railway stations in the United States opened in 1980